Stump is a surname. It is commonly found as an Anglicized version of the German names 'Stumpf', 'Stumph', and other variations.

Notable people
 Al Stump, Alvin John Stump (1916–1995), American author and sports writer
 Alfred Stump (1860–1925), Australian photographer
 Carl Stumpf (1848-1936), German philosopher, student of Brentano and master of Husserl
 Cinderella G. Stump, occasional pseudonym of Jo Stafford
 Prof Claude Stump (1891–1971) Australian embryologist, son of Alfred Stump
 Samuel John Stump (1779–1863), English painter
 Henry Stump (died 1865), Baltimore Judge who presided over the Plug-Ugly trial
 Herman Stump (1837–1917), American politician, President of the Maryland State Senate
 J. Henry Stump (1880–1849), American politician, Socialist, mayor of Reading, Pennsylvania
 Horst Stump (1944–2018), Romanian boxer 
 Felix Stump (1894–1972), United States Navy Commander
 Bob Stump (1927–2003), US Congressman
 Eleonore Stump (born 1947), American philosopher
 Patrick Stump (born 1984), American singer-songwriter, of rock band Fall Out Boy